The following is a partial list of radio stations in Liberia. Liberia has many local radio stations, many of them broadcasting in regional languages, of which there are more than 30. Some stations may be missing from this list; others may be listed more than once if they were referred to by more than one name by different sources.

 Pumah FM 106.3
Hott FM 107.9
  Buffalo VOA 94.1 FM
  Magic Radio 99.2 FM Monrovia
 Crystal FM
 DC 101
 ELBC Radio
 ELWA
 Gbaisue Radio
 Jam Radio
 King's FM
 LCBN
 Liberia Broadcasting System
 Liberia Communication Network  (defunct?) 
 Life Zorzor
 Love FM
 Magic FM
 Peace FM (same as below?)
 Peace Radio
 Power FM
 Radio Barrobo
 Radio Beaganlay
 Radio Bomi
 Radio Bong Mine
 Radio Cape Mount
 Radio Dukpa
 Radio Flumpa
 Radio Gbarnga
 Radio Gbartala
 Radio Gbehzohn
 Radio Gee
 Radio Grand Kru
 Radio Harleygee (same as below?)
 Radio Harlengnee
 Radio Harleyike
 Radio Harper
 Radio Jorwah
 Radio Jorwai
 Radio Joy Africa
 Radio Kakata
 Radio Karhn (same as below?)
 Radio Karn
 Radio Kergheamahn
 Radio Kintoma
 Radio Kpo
 Radio Kwageh
 Radio Liberia International  (defunct?)
 Radio Life
 Radio Montserrado
 Radio Nimba
 Radio Peace
 Radio Piso
 Radio Saboyea
 Radio Saclepea
 Radio Salala (same as "Salala Broadcasting Service" below?)
 Radio Sanweih
 Radio Sass Town
 Radio Shalom
 Radio Smile
 Radio Super Bongese
 Radio Tamba Taikor (same as "(Radio) Tamba Taykor" below?)
 Radio Tappita
 Radio Totota
 Radio Veritas
 Radio Webbo
 Radio Ylamba
 Radio Zota
 Rivercess Broadcasting Service
 Salala Broadcasting Service
 STAR Radio
 Sawu FM
 Sky FM
 Smile FM
 (Radio) Tamba Taykor 
 Truth FM
 UNMIL Radio
 Voice of Gompa
 Voice of Hope
 Voice of Pleebo
 Voice of Reconciliation
 Voice of RM
 Voice of Sinoe
 Voice of Tappita
 Voice of Webbo
Voice fm by Randall Dobayou
 Y-Echo
 Y-FM
 HOTT FM
 Cape Rock

Makona Communications Inc. Radio Makona

Voice of BKS

See also
Flash Radio 102.2
Add a radio station
 List of newspapers in Liberia
 Communications in Liberia

References 

Liberia
Radio